Gaspar Roca was a Puerto Rican journalist and economist. He attended and graduated from the Valley Forge Military Academy He was educated at Wharton School, University of Pennsylvania, and held prominent positions in government and the private sector, including the presidency of the Puerto Rico Industrial Development Company (PRIDCO).

Journalism
Roca was the founder and editor of the Puerto Rican newspaper El Vocero, filling a market niche for a crime-oriented tabloid, left by the closing of El Imparcial. Under his editorship, El Vocero evolved into a mainstream newspaper  with legitimate news articles, a well-known set of columnists, including Luis Dávila Colón, Obed Betancourt, José Arsenio Torres, Roberto Rexach Benítez, Eudaldo Báez Galib and Juan Manuel García Passalacqua, and a wide variety of sections and supplements.

Press freedom
One of his contributions to journalism was his willingness to bankroll freedom of information lawsuits, that have opened government to intense press and public scrutiny. An example is the United States Supreme Court decision declaring unconstitutional the Puerto Rico judiciary's rule barring the press from over 30,000 yearly closed-door preliminary hearings where probable-cause was determined in criminal proceedings (El Vocero de Puerto Rico vs Puerto Rico, 508 US 147 (1993)).  Other examples include the 1992 lawsuit that forced political candidates to make public their personal finances, and the case declaring unconstitutional Puerto Rico's "criminal defamation" law, that had a limiting effect on the exercise of press freedom right in Puerto Rico.

Journalism in Puerto Rico, and in the mainland United States, has benefitted from these judicial victories. For example, many freedom of the press court cases and lawsuits filed before state and federal courts cite the holding in El Vocero's 1993 US Supreme Court case.

See also
 List of Puerto Ricans

References

External links
El Vocero

1926 births
2007 deaths
People from Yauco, Puerto Rico
Puerto Rican journalists
Valley Forge Military Academy and College alumni
20th-century journalists